Kathryn Phipps is a Jamaican lawyer and diplomat currently serving as Jamaica Ambassador to Cuba.

Career 
Phipps practiced law for more than three decades specializing in international law, international trade and organisations with focus on the Caribbean region.  In 2000, she participated in the US Department of States’ International Visitor Programme. She served on the board of South East Regional Health Authority and the GC Foster College for Sports and Physical Education and was the chair of Medical Appeals Tribunals and a member of the Committee for the review of Jamaica Justice System. She was appointed Jamaica Ambassador to Cuba in 2018 replacing A’Dale Robinson.

References 

Jamaican women lawyers
Jamaican diplomats
Year of birth missing (living people)
Living people
20th-century Jamaican lawyers
21st-century Jamaican lawyers